Uqair, alternatively spelled as al-'Uqair, Uqayr, and Ogair, is an ancient seaport city in the Al-Ahsa Governorate of the Eastern Province of Saudi Arabia. It is the first seaport in the Persian Gulf and has been linked by some to the ancient city of Gerrha mentioned in Greek and Roman sources. The site was also the location of the conference at which the Uqair Protocol of 1922 was issued, which helped to establish the borders of modern Saudi Arabia.

At the ancient locale are the remains of a large fort that now marks the site of the same name. The current structure that exists is of unknown origin. (The Arabian Gulf in Antiquity, Vol. II, D.T. Potts, P. 56).

Location
It is located on the coast of the Persian Gulf, on a straight line between the oasis and the island state of Bahrain. Modern maps place Uqair at the harbor and shallow lagoon the fort was built next to.

Other important surrounding locations of antiquity
The location of pre-Islamic Al-Hasa is of great importance and relevance to Uqair. Artesian wells once fed "a series of interconnected streams and lakes draining north eastward toward the Persian Gulf above Uqair.  Reports of the existence of this active ravine system can be traced back to the time of Pliny." (Potts, p. 29). Evidence of this effluent has a great bearing on the exploration of the fort at Uqair and the ancient Arabian city of Gerrha. A large source of fresh water near the Persian Gulf is reason enough to create a trading port located at Uqair and to facilitate the civilization that flourished at Al-Hasa. It is well documented that the Al-Hasa region and most notably Uqair were once considered to be strong candidates for the possible lost city of Gerrha, an emporium of trade and mercantile activity dating to at least 225 BC.

Other ancient civilizations flourished in the surrounding area.  Across the shallow Gulf strait sixty miles to the northeast are the ancient burial mounds of what is now known to be the lost ancient civilization of Dilmun. These burial mounds estimated at more than 100,000, rest on the island of Bahrain (Looking for Dilmun, Geoffrey Bibby, p. 7).  On the Arabian Peninsula, the walled city of Thaj is 80 miles north of Uqair and just 20 miles inland from another ancient Arabian oasis, Qatif. Both of these sites have been dated to at least the Hellenistic period. The Saudi island of Tarut, another rich archeological area, lies 40 miles to the east of the old port and fishing village of Jubail, which once served Thaj and Qatif, and is located about 35 miles north of Uqair.

Links to ancient Gerrha 
Ancient Gerrha has been associated with several locations. The notorious shifting sands of the desert have made it difficult to locate the trading emporium, well described in general history and archeological texts. Even though Uqair is the present location of what is believed to be an Islamic fort, the whole region twenty miles north of the current structure was also referred to as Uqair, or Gerrha, long before the fort was built.  The lost city of Gerrha according to Danish archeologist Geoffrey Bibby, however, "still awaits its discoverer." (Bibby, p. 325)

Ties to Mesopotamia 
Trade and commerce of early civilizations in the Persian Gulf region was both the umbilical cord to surrounding cultures and the eventual physical link that has allowed scientists and researchers to literally piece together its murky history. The greatest regional center of civilization lay only 300 miles north of Uqair at the confluence of the Tigris and Euphrates Rivers. Mesopotamia, a very fertile region north of this confluence in modern Iraq, and where Sumerian civilization began. By 3500 BC the Sumerians were living and trading beyond the Strait of Hormuz, venturing out as far as the Indus River and the Red Sea. The Sumerians were conquered by the Semitic Akkadians in 2340, becoming united under Babylon from 1792 - 1750 BC.

Dilmun 
Gerrha was preceded by the legendary Sumerian-era civilization of Dilmun (4000 - 2000 BC), which has been archeologically linked to the northern tip of Bahrain.  During its zenith, the culture controlled the oceanic trading routes to the Indies and was the trading link to the Indus Valley and Mesopotamia (Area Handbook for the Persian Gulf States, 1st Edition, p. 11).  To the Sumerians, Dilmun was the land of immortality and the god of Abzu. The second sea of fresh water that lay beneath the gulf and was believed to flow from the Tigris and Euphrates under the ground to present Bahrain - in the land called Enki. "Dilmun founded a maritime network unrivaled for its breadth by any other in the early days of man's world ... it was home of the Utunapishtim, who survived the flood, it was soapstone for figurines, alabaster for bowls, carnelian heads beads, cowries and pearls ... it was copper and lapis lazuli." ("The Sumerian Connection", Jon Mandaville and Michael Grimsdale, ARAMCO World March/April 1980). Dilmun is the "Paradise Land, the original home of the gods, the archetypical Holy Land" to which  the Mesopotamian hero Gilgamesh travels to in his epic journey. (Dilmun Discovered, Michael Rice, p. 7).

Historical mentions of Gerrha
In accounts written by his biographer Arrian, Alexander the Great mentions a planned coastal exploration of 323 BC that includes the eastern Arabian coast but does not mention Gerrha. A hundred years later, however, Eratosthenes tells of merchants from Gerrha carrying their spices and incense overland to Mesopotamia. And later Strabo quotes Artimedoros: "by the incense trade ... the Gerrhaei have become the richest of all the tribes and possess great quantity of wrought articles in gold and silver." (Bibby, p. 317). Gerrha is described by Pliny the Elder: "On the Arabian shore of the Gulf one comes to the island Ichara and then the Gulf of Capeus where we find the city of Gerrha, five miles in circumference, with towers built of square blocks of salt. Fifty miles from the east lying in the interior is the region of Attene and opposite to Gerrha is the island of Tylos." (Bibby, p. 318).

Wealth of Gerrha
In 200 BC a Greek grammarian named Agathrachides, who wrote a book on the Erythraean (modern Red) Sea now lost, is quoted by the Roman geographer/historian Strabo on Gerrha: "from their trafficking, the Gerrhaeans have become the richest of all; and they have a vast equipment of both gold and silver articles, such as couches and tripods and bowls, together with drinking vessels and very costly houses; for doors and wall and ceilings are variegated with ivory and gold and silver set with precious stones." (Frankincense and Myrrh, A Study of Arabian Incense Trade, Nigel Groom, p. 67).  The city of Gerrha played a central role in the interchange of commodities of certain regions of the Arabian Peninsula during the reign of the Seleucid King Antioch III, (223 - 187 BC). Most notable was the frankincense and myrrh of southwestern Arabia in Yemen's Hadramawt region.

The Gerrhaeans also traded with East Africa and China through India.  In their activity "they act as the warehouse for everything from Asia and Europe ... seem more prosperous than the Sabaeans." (Groom, p. 71). Trade through Gerrha was heavy in the time of Antioch; Strabo writes: "the leading people of this time were the Gerrhaeans, and the Arab tribe whose capital lay on the mainland just opposite Bahrain made ... enormous incomes by trading the precious wares of Arabia and India to the mouths of the Euphrates and Tigris, along the upper course of the rivers by ancient caravan routes to the coast of Syria and Phoenicia even as far as Delos and the Aegean Sea." (Bibby, p. 113).

The lure of wealth generated in Gerrha by its inhabitants was too tempting for Antiochus to avoid.  In 205 BC, he felt it necessary to make a large-scale military incursion against the Gerrhaeans with the object of securing himself a reasonable portion of their trade. (Bibby, p. 330).  Antiochus was diverted from his goal of capturing the city, however, when the "Gerrhaeans bought off his attack with 500 talents of silver, 1000 talents of frankincense, and 200 talents of 'stacte' myrrh." (Groom, p. 195).

Geoffrey Bibby and Uqair 
Geoffrey Bibby, an English archeologist who excavated on the island of Bahrain from 1954 to 1969 and claimed it to be Dilmun, included Uqair, across the straits, in his investigations, visiting it on three separate journeys, in 1963 by air only, and in 1965 and in 1968 by land.  Bibby wrote:

"Tylos we knew was Bahrain...Attene, was fifty miles inland, was normally believed to be the Hofuf oasis. On the coast, in the direct line between Hofuf and Bahrain, lay the village of Uqair, and beside it the ruins of a large walled town.  It had seemed obvious to many modern theorists that Uqair must be Gerrha and the identification seemed clinched by the fact that in the local dialect of the Arabic, the letter 'q' was pronounced as a 'g.'  Uqair is pronounced Ogair, which is close enough to the Greek name to be convincing." (Bibby, p. 318).

In Bibby's quest for the city of Dilmun he managed three sondages (digs) at the city of Uqair. Of his investigation, he detailed his search for pre-Islamic clues: "the ruined city of Uqair stretches more vastly on the ground than it appeared from the air.  I followed ... the northern wall across the subkha [Arabic term for dried salt flats] toward the shore, the ruined tower - certainly a modern addition - marked the southwestern corner ... ahead of me the wall ended at a coastal tower, but like the wall, only a course or so high ... and beyond the strait lay the mud brick houses and yellow fort of the present villages." (Bibby, p. 323).

Bibby details the construction of the wall and deduces that  "the wall was built of a coral like conglomerate called farush," which to Bibby "felt wrong because of the fluctuating level of sea water." He stated; "If anywhere there was a subkha today there should have been water even as recently as 2000 years ago. If that were true then this wall (at Uqair) could not be as old as the wall at Thaj." (Bibby, p. 324).  (The walls of Thaj, another ruined city near Qatif, were built during the same period as Gerrha - the Greek period.)  But as Bibby concludes ... "in the cities of the Greek period on Bahrain and the temple of towns of the Seleucid on Failaka (an island off the coast of Kuwait once thought to be a Hellenistic foundry of coins) farush was never used.  The walls there were made of quarried limestone." (Bibby, p. 324.)

Northwest of Uqair, referred to as the salt mine site, or Gerrha, are the extensive remains of irrigation works and fields visible on aerial photographs of the area, some of which may be dated to the Hellenistic period. (Potts, p. 56-57).  Bibby went to these irrigation channels to dig and search for artifacts in 1968.  He excavated what he labeled the "subkha fort and produced several shards comparable to types known from Thaj and Hellenistic Bahrain.  Identical results were obtained in a sounding carried out in a different structure.  This was the so called inland fort.  It measured 150 ft. (49 m) by 156 ft. (52 m) and was constructed by large stone ashlars.  The contention has sometimes been made that this was the site of ancient Gerrha, but there is no evidence to support this. (Potts, p. 56-57).  The site of the fort is not the same as the irrigation channels.

Portuguese influence 
It is not impossible the fort at Uqair could be the result of the Portuguese domination of the Persian Gulf, which began in 1506 with the expedition of Afonso de Albuquerque. His mission was to destroy Arab trade and establish Portuguese dominance. Their oppressive influence may have completely transformed the regional power structure but they left no religious and hardly any cultural imprint, except for their cannons and ruined garrisons. (From the Trucial States to the United Arab Emirates, Frauke Heard-Bay, p. 271).  Before the Portuguese, "wealthy city states were developed around favorably situated harbors ... inhabited mostly by Arab tribes ... to dominate the entrepot trade between India, Arab countries and Europe, which passed through Mesopotamia and the Red Sea."  (From the Trucial States to the United Arab Emirates, Geoffrey Frauke Heard-Bey, p. 271). The construction of Portuguese forts was common.  A large structure still stands on the island of Bahrain (1521 AD) in recognition of its importance as a favorable position to assert their power and control of the Persian Gulf by way of the Straits of Hormuz. (Dilmun Discovered, Michael Rice, p. 70). The Portuguese left the Gulf in 1648 after several revolts of Arab natives attempted to regain their harbors and trade.  The confusion and growing interest of the Turks (who also built forts in the region) and Persians created a situation for the Portuguese which they could not control.  (The Arabian Peninsula, George Allen, p. 94).

Conference of Uqair 

Lastly, Uqair was an historic meeting place of major early Arabian political importance.  In 1922, prominent politicians and leaders met to discuss and from new boundaries of the growing Arab state under Ibn Saud, the new revolutionary leader who was conquering the peninsula and attempting to unite it.  In attendance at the Conference of Uqair was Sir Percy Zachariah Cox of Great Britain. Representing the not yet established kingdom of Saudi Arabia was Ibn Saud himself. The purpose of the rendezvous was to harness and "guarantee the limits of Saudi expansion." (House of Saud, David Holden/Richard Johns, p. 79). At the meeting, the delegates formed the Protocol of Uqair to define the borders between northeastern Saudi Arabia with Kuwait and Iraq. Sir Percy Cox reportedly drew a line on the map from the head of the Persian Gulf (in the east) to the Trans-Jordan frontier (in the west). It gave Ibn Saud a large chunk of territory by Kuwait ... but transferred another large slice of Ibn Saud's territory into Iraqi hands. And to meet the needs of the Bedouin tribes ... a neutral zone." (The House of Saud, David Holden and Richard Johns, p. 80). Back then, Kuwait was ruled by Sheikh Ahmad Al-Jaber, who did not attend the meeting and was later informed of the new borders.

Further reading

Area Handbook for the Persian Gulf States, 1st Edition.
Bibby, G., Looking for Dilmun.
Frauke Heard-Bey, G. A. 1996. From the Trucial States to the United Arab Emirates.
Groom, N., Frankincense and Myrrh, A Study of Arabian Incense Trade.
Holden, D., and Johns, R. The House of Saud.
Mandaville, J. and Grimsdale M., "The Sumerian Connection", ARAMCO World, March/April 1980.
Potts, D. T., The Persian Gulf in Antiquity, Vol. II.
Rice, M., Dilmun Discovered.
A Visit To Some Early Cities, 1963, Saudi Aramco World

References 

Populated places in Eastern Province, Saudi Arabia
Geography of Saudi Arabia
Forts in Saudi Arabia
History of Saudi Arabia
Castles in Saudi Arabia